Forest/Jupiter station is a DART Light Rail station in Garland, Texas. It opened on November 18, 2002 and serves Garland-area businesses, including Raytheon Systems and Sears Service Center.

External links 
 DART - Forest/Jupiter Station

Dallas Area Rapid Transit light rail stations
Railway stations in the United States opened in 2002
Transportation in Garland, Texas
2002 establishments in Texas
Railway stations in Dallas County, Texas